This is a list of independent bookstores in the United States, both current and defunct, which have had physical ("brick-and-mortar") locations. Stores which have gone out of business are denoted with a dagger (†).

Alaska
Fireside Books in Palmer, Alaska

Arizona

Bookmans in Tucson, Mesa, Phoenix and Flagstaff

California

Acres of Books† in Long Beach
Amicus Books in Marysville 
Bart's Books in Ojai
Bodhi Tree Bookstore† in Los Angeles (eventually West Hollywood)
The Book Shop in Hayward
Book Soup in West Hollywood
Booksmith in San Francisco
Borderlands Books in San Francisco
Bound Together Anarchist Collective Bookstore in San Francisco
City Lights Bookstore in San Francisco
Cody's Books† in Berkeley
Computer Literacy Bookshops† in Sunnyvale
Daliel's Bookstore† in Berkeley
A Different Light† in Silver Lake (Los Angeles) and The Castro (San Francisco)
Dutton's Books† in Valley Village (Los Angeles) and Burbank
Fahrenheit 451 Books† in Laguna Beach
Green Apple Books & Music in Richmond District (San Francisco)
John Cole's Book Shop† in La Jolla (San Diego)
Kepler's Books in Menlo Park 
The Last Bookstore in Los Angeles
Lobal Orning† in Topanga
Marcus Books in San Francisco and Oakland
Midnight Special Bookstore† in Santa Monica
Mysterious Galaxy in San Diego and Redondo Beach
The Other Change of Hobbit in Berkeley
Printers Inc. Bookstore† in Palo Alto
Tia Chucha's Centro Cultural in Sylmar (Los Angeles)
Vroman's Bookstore in Pasadena

Colorado

Tattered Cover in Denver

Connecticut
R.J. Julia Booksellers in Madison

District of Columbia

Brian MacKenzie Infoshop†
Busboys and Poets
Kramerbooks & Afterwords
Lambda Rising†
MahoganyBooks
Politics and Prose
Teaching for Change Bookstore†
Washington Bookshop†
World Bank Infoshop

Florida
Haslam's Bookstore in St. Petersburg
Open Books & Records† in Miami Beach

Georgia
Charis Books & More in Decatur
For Keeps (bookstore) in Atlanta

Illinois

Kroch's and Brentano's† in Chicago
New World Resource Center† in Chicago
Prairie Avenue Bookshop† in Chicago
Quimby's Bookstore in Chicago
Seminary Co-op in Chicago
Unabridged Bookstore in Chicago
Women & Children First in Chicago

Indiana

Better World Books in Goshen and Mishawaka
Boxcar Books in Bloomington

Iowa

ACME Comics & Collectibles in Sioux City
Prairie Lights in Iowa City

Kansas

Eighth Day Books in Wichita
Rainy Day Books in Fairway

Kentucky

Joseph-Beth Booksellers in Lexington

Louisiana

Iron Rail Book Collective in New Orleans

Maine

Sherman's Maine Coast Book Shops (nine locations)
Weiser Antiquarian Books in York

Maryland

Daedalus Books in Columbia
Greetings & Readings† in Hunt Valley
Red Emma's Bookstore Coffeehouse in Baltimore
Victor Kamkin Bookstore† in Rockville

Massachusetts

The Bookmill in Montague
Globe Corner Bookstore† in Cambridge
Grolier Poetry Bookshop in Cambridge
Harvard Book Store in Cambridge
Lucy Parsons Center in Boston
New Words Bookstore† in Cambridge
The Odyssey Bookshop in South Hadley
Schoenhof's Foreign Books in Cambridge
That's Entertainment in Worcester

Michigan

John K. King Books in Detroit
Marwil Bookstore† in Detroit
Schuler Books & Music in Grand Rapids
 McKlean and Eakin Booksellers in Petoskey
 Between The Covers in Harbor Springs

Minnesota

Amazon Bookstore Cooperative† in Minneapolis
Birchbark Books in Minneapolis
Common Good Books in Saint Paul
DreamHaven Books in Minneapolis
Mayday Books in Minneapolis
SubText: a Bookstore in Saint Paul
Mager's & Quinn in Minneapolis

Mississippi

Square Books in Oxford

Missouri
Left Bank Books in St. Louis

Nevada

Gambler's Book Shop in Las Vegas
The Writer's Block in Las Vegas
Copper Cat Books in Henderson

New York

Albertine Books in Manhattan
Bluestockings in Manhattan (1999–)

Coliseum Books† in Manhattan
Community Bookstore† in Cobble Hill, Brooklyn
Community Bookstore in Park Slope, Brooklyn
A Different Light† in Manhattan
Gotham Book Mart† in Manhattan
Housing Works Bookstore Cafe in Manhattan
J. Levine Books and Judaica in Manhattan
Librairie de France† in Manhattan 
The Mysterious Bookshop in Manhattan
Nkiru Books† in Brooklyn
Oscar Wilde Bookshop† in Manhattan
Pomander Book Shop in Manhattan
Printed Matter, Inc in Manhattan
Rizzoli Bookstore† in Manhattan
St. Mark's Bookshop in Manhattan
Strand Bookstore in Manhattan (1927–)
Unnameable Books in Brooklyn

North Carolina

Firestorm Cafe & Books in Asheville
Internationalist Books in Chapel Hill

Ohio

The Book Loft of German Village in Columbus
Two Dollar Radio Headquarters in Columbus
The Wooster Book Company† in Wooster

Oklahoma

Archives Books in Edmond
Full Circle Bookstore in Oklahoma City
Magic City Books in Tulsa

Oregon

The Duck Store in Eugene
In Other Words Women's Books and Resources† in Portland
Powell's Books in Portland
Rose City Book Pub

Pennsylvania

City Books in Pittsburgh
Giovanni's Room Bookstore in Philadelphia
Leary's Book Store† in Philadelphia
Moravian Book Shop in Bethlehem
Wooden Shoe Books and Records in Philadelphia

South Carolina

Hub City Bookshop in Spartanburg

Texas

Beauty and the Book† in Jefferson
BookPeople in Austin

Washington
Chin Music Press in Pike Place Market, Seattle
Elliott Bay Book Company in Seattle
Third Place Books in 3 locations Lake Forest Park, Northeast Seattle, & South Seattle
Left Bank Books in Pike Place Market, Seattle

West Virginia
Taylor Books in Charleston, West Virginia

Wisconsin 

Renaissance Books in Milwaukee
A Room of One's Own in Madison
Woodland Pattern Book Center in Milwaukee
Janke Book Store in Wausau

See also

American Booksellers Association
Books in the United States
List of bookstore chains
List of independent bookstores

References

External links
 AALBC.com's map showing black-owned independent booksellers
 American Booksellers Association member directory
 Independent booksellers resource page and listings
 IndieBound.org, independent bookstore association sponsored by the American Booksellers Association
 Midwest Independent Booksellers Association
 NewPages guide to independent bookstores in the U.S. and Canada

°
 
Independent bookstores in the United States
Bookstores, Independent